Alcide Cerato (born 11 February 1939 in Legnaro) is an Italian former professional road cyclist and entrepreneur. Professional from 1961 to 1964, he notably finished third in the 1962 Giro di Lombardia. He also rode in the 1962 and 1963 Giro d'Italia.

In 1964, his career was cut short from a bad crash in the Giro di Lombardia, and he went on to take over his father-in-law's funeral home business, and soo after founded the company Impresa San Siro in Milan.

Major results
1959
 1st Gran Premio Città di Camaiore
1962
 2nd Giro del Trentino
 2nd Coppa Placci
 3rd Giro di Lombardia
1963
 3rd Coppa Placci
 3rd Individual pursuit, National Track Championships

References

External links

1939 births
Living people
Italian male cyclists
Cyclists from the Province of Padua